The Globe is the sixth album by alternative dance group Big Audio Dynamite II, their second album credited under that name instead of Big Audio Dynamite. It was released on 16 July 1991 in the United States, and in August elsewhere else, just after their limited UK-only album Kool-Aid and includes reworked versions of some of its songs. The Globe was certified Gold by the RIAA. Some CD versions came with the live album Ally Pally Paradiso as an additional disc.

Cover design
The album cover was designed by surfer Shawn Stussy, who earlier founded the eponymous fashion brand.

Tours
Big Audio Dynamite II toured to promote The Globe in late 1992. There was only one stop on the tour in the United States, at Tipitina's in New Orleans. However, they also opened for Public Enemy and U2 on the Achtung Baby tour. Furthermore, they toured in support of the album in the fall of 1991. On that tour, The Farm opened for them.

Track listing
 All songs written by Mick Jones and Gary Stonadge except as indicated.

Personnel
Big Audio Dynamite II
 Mick Jones – lead vocals, guitar
 Nick Hawkins – guitar, backing vocals
 Gary Stonadge – bass guitar, backing vocals
 Chris Kavanagh – drums, percussion, backing vocals

Additional personnel
 Gobblebox – vocals on "The Globe"
 Sipho the Human Beatbox – beatbox on "The Globe"
 Lorna Stucki – vocals on "The Tea Party"
 André Shapps – engineer
 Shawn Stussy – artwork, design

Charts

Certifications

References

1991 albums
Big Audio Dynamite albums
Columbia Records albums